James R. Ford (December 1, 1925 – October 11, 2017) was an American educator, politician, and businessman. In 1972, Ford became the first African-American mayor of Tallahassee, Florida, and the first black mayor of a U.S. state capital city. He later served for fourteen years as a city commissioner, being repeatedly re-elected.

Early life and career
Ford was born and raised in Leon County, attending local public schools, which were segregated. He went to college at Florida A&M University, a historically black university, where he earned his B.S. in 1950 and his MEd in 1959. He served in both the U.S. Navy and the U.S. Army.

He worked in the Leon County public school system from 1950 to 1987, starting as a teacher. Later he became the county system's first black administrator, presiding over Leon County's first integrated school staff.

Mayor of Tallahassee
In 1971, he was elected as a Tallahassee city commissioner. In 1972, Ford was elected as Tallahassee's first African-American mayor and the first African-American mayor of any state capital city. He was elected to subsequent terms as mayor in 1976 and 1982 while serving during the interim periods as a city commissioner (1973–1975 and 1977–1981) as well as after his last term (1983–1985). As mayor and commissioner, he played a key role in establishing the Minority Business Department, the Frenchtown Area Development Authority, and the Affirmative Action Office. He also worked to eliminate segregated practices in the city government and to secure employment opportunities for blacks.

Business career 
Ford was also active in the business community. He built WAMN Radio Station, becoming Tallahassee's first black manager of a radio station. He owned and managed six businesses and acted as the president of CNJ Associates.

Civic activities

Ford served as the president of Sigma Phi Pi and Alpha Phi Alpha fraternities, which he had joined in college. He was president of the Tallahassee Urban League and the Tallahassee chapter of 100 Black Men. He was commander of the Tallahassee Sail and Power Squadron.

He also sat on the boards of the Chamber of Commerce, the United Way, Meals on Wheels, the March of Dimes Big Bend Chapter, the American Red Cross's Tallahassee Chapter, and the Florida League of Cities. He also sat on the boards of the Tallahassee Memorial Regional Medical Center, the Lively Vocational School and Peoples 1st Community Bank.

Personal life
He married Clinita, and they had three children together: a son James R. Ford Jr. and two daughters, Janita and JaKathryn. Ford died on October 11, 2017 at the age of 91.

References

1925 births
2017 deaths
Mayors of Tallahassee, Florida
Businesspeople from Florida
Educators from Florida
African-American business executives
American business executives
African-American activists
Florida Democrats
Florida A&M University alumni
African-American mayors in Florida
20th-century American businesspeople
21st-century African-American people